Anil Baluni (born 2 December 1970) is an Indian politician and National Chief Spokesperson of the Bharatiya Janata Party. On 10 March 2018 he was nominated as candidate for the Rajya Sabha from Uttarakhand.

He was born in Pauri Garhwal of Uttarakhand but his official residences are Nainital and New Delhi.

Personal life
He is married to Deepti Joshi and has a son and a daughter Ganga.

Position Held

References

1970 births
Living people
People from Nainital district
Rajya Sabha members from Uttarakhand
Bharatiya Janata Party politicians from Uttarakhand
Rajya Sabha members from the Bharatiya Janata Party